Hope is the first studio album by American hip hop duo Non-Prophets. It was released on Lex Records on September 29, 2003. The album was produced entirely by Joe Beats and all vocal duties were handled by Sage Francis. "Damage" was released as a single from the album. The album peaked at number 9 on the CMJ Hip-Hop chart.

Critical reception

Rollie Pemberton of Pitchfork gave the album a 9.2 out of 10, saying, "A highly valued reminder of the need for traditionalism in modern music, this album stands strong as one of the year's finest." Pitchfork placed it at number 19 on the "Top 50 Albums of 2003" list.

In 2012, Complex placed it at number 28 on the "30 Best Underground Hip-Hop Albums" list. In 2014, Paste included it on the "12 Classic Hip-Hop Albums That Deserve More Attention" list.

Track listing

"Bounce" is a hidden track that plays after the instrumental "Outro".

Personnel
Credits adapted from liner notes.
 Sage Francis – vocals, executive production
 Joe Beats – production, executive production
 DJ Mek-a-lek – turntables
 Sixtoo – vocal recording, engineering, mixing
 Chris Warren – vocal recording, engineering, mixing

Hopestrumentals

In 2005, Joe Beats released the album's instrumental version, titled Hopestrumentals. Unlike the original version, it includes 3 bonus instrumentals and "Bounce" is not a hidden track.

References

External links
 

2003 debut albums
Sage Francis albums
Joe Beats albums
Lex Records albums